Hebert is a Canadian community, located in Kent County, New Brunswick. The community is situated in southeastern New Brunswick, to the northwest of Moncton. Hebert is located mainly at the intersection of New Brunswick Route 126 and New Brunswick Route 515.  The end of the Bouctouche River ends north of this community.

History

Notable people

See also
List of communities in New Brunswick

References

Bordering communities

Canaan Station, New Brunswick
Birch Ridge, New Brunswick
Saint Paul de Kent, New Brunswick
Terrains de L'Évêque, New Brunswick

Communities in Kent County, New Brunswick